The Asociación de Guías Scouts de Venezuela (AGSV, Association of Guide Scouts of Venezuela) is the national Guiding organization of Venezuela. It serves 600 members (approximately). Founded in 1958, the girls-only organization became a full member of the World Association of Girl Guides and Girl Scouts in 1966.

Program and ideals
The association is divided in four sections according to age:
 Margaritas - ages 4 to 5
 Haditas - ages 6 to 10
 Guías Menores - ages 10 to 14
 Guías Mayores - ages 15 to 20

Guide Promise

Yo prometo por mi honor, hacer cuanto de mí dependa,
para cumplir con mi deber hacia Dios y mi patria,
ser útil al prójimo en todo momento,
y obedecer la Ley Guía.

Guide Law
 La Guía es leal y merece confianza.
 La Guía es útil y ayuda a otros.
 La Guía es comprensiva y generosa.
 La Guía es hermana de toda muchacha Guía.
 La Guía es cortés.
 La Guía ve en la naturaleza la obra de Dios, y la protege.
 La Guía sabe obedecer.
 La Guía es valiente y animosa en sus dificultades.
 La Guía es económica y ordenada.
 La Guía es pura en lo que piensa, dice y hace.

See also
 Asociación de Scouts de Venezuela

External links
  

World Association of Girl Guides and Girl Scouts member organizations
Scouting and Guiding in Venezuela
Youth organizations established in 1958
1958 establishments in Venezuela